Rochambeau Statue and Memorial is a monument to French nobleman and General Jean-Baptiste Donatien de Vimeur, comte de Rochambeau, who was a key commander of the French forces who assisted the Continental Army during the American Revolutionary War. The monument is located on the waterfront in King Park, along the southern edge of Newport Harbor, near Brenton Cove and Fort Adams state park and was erected in 1934. This is the 3rd replica of the Rochambeau Statue in Lafayette Park, Washington DC, which was created by renowned French sculptor Fernand Harmar. It was donated by A. Kingsley Macomber. The statue was restored in 2019 by the fundraising efforts of members of the Alliance Française of Newport.

See also
 1934 in art

References 

Monuments and memorials in Rhode Island
1934 sculptures
Bronze sculptures in Rhode Island
Statues in Rhode Island
1934 establishments in Rhode Island
Sculptures of men in Rhode Island
Outdoor sculptures in Rhode Island